Anastasia Vinnikova, (Anastasija Vinnikava) born 15 April 1991 is Belarusian singer. She represented her country at the Eurovision Song Contest 2011 with the song "I Love Belarus", but failed to qualify to the final.

History
Anastasia Vinnikova was born in Dzyarzhynsk, BSSR on 15 April 1991. Anastasia attended the Minsk State Linguistic University, School of Translation and Interpreting.

Eurovision
Anastasia participated in Eurovision in 2011 with the song "I Love Belarus". The song was written by Evgeny Oleinik. Originally, Vinnikova was to perform the song "Born in Bielorussia" until it was discovered that the song had been previously performed in the summer of 2010. Anastasia competed in the second semi-final at Eurovision. Belarus placed fourteenth with a total of forty-five points.

Discography

Singles
 2009 : Your Love Is...
 2010 : Here We Go for the Gold
 2010 : Born in Bielorussia
 2010 : Мама
 2011 : I Feel You
 2011 : I Love Belarus (Мая Беларусь-Моя Беларусь) 
 2011 : Shining in Twilight
 2012 : One Life 2012 : Crazy 2012 : Календарь 2013 : It's My Life with Petr Elfimov
 2013 : Хто Казаў with Aura
 2016 : Паранойя 2017 : Нулевой рубеж 2018 : НелюбовьInconnu :Тысячы зор''

References

1991 births
Living people
Eurovision Song Contest entrants for Belarus
21st-century Belarusian women singers
Eurovision Song Contest entrants of 2011